Patna University is a public state university in Patna, Bihar, India. It was established on 1 October 1917 during the British Raj. It is the first university in Bihar and the seventh oldest university in the Indian subcontinent in the modern era. It offers different undergraduate and postgraduate degree level courses.

History

Patna University was established by an Act of the Imperial Legislative Council passed in September 1917. It started the journey in October 1917 as an affiliating and examining body when JG Jennings took charge of this university as the first vice-chancellor. In the modern era of India, it is one of the oldest universities in this region. Later in 1919, the governing bodies of the university—the Senate and the Syndicate—were formed. The iconic Wheeler Senate House of the Patna University was built in 1926 for which Raja Devaki Nandan Prasad of Munger donated the money.  When the university was first established it had jurisdiction over all higher educational institutes of Bihar, Odisha, and the Kingdom of Nepal. It oversaw examinations for educational institutions ranging from school finals to the postgraduate levels. This situation continued almost for four decades, until the establishment of the Tribhuvan University, Kathmandu, and the Utkal University, Bhubaneshwar. On 2 January 1952, it was converted into a purely teaching-cum-residential university with territorial jurisdiction over only metropolitan Patna.  The university buildings are mostly located on the bank of the River Ganges and in the Saidpur Campus.

Organisation and administration

Governance
Chancellor of the Patna University is the governor of Bihar. The Vice-chancellor of the Patna University is the chief executive officer of the university. Girish Kumar Chaudhary is the current Vice-chancellor of the university.

Faculties and departments
Patna University has 30 departments organised into eight faculties: Science, Humanities, Commerce, Social Sciences, Education, Law, Fine Arts and Medicine.

Faculty of Science

This faculty consists of the departments of Physics, Chemistry, Mathematics, Botany, Zoology, Statistics, and Geology.

Faculty of Humanities

This faculty consists of the departments of  English, Hindi,  Bangla, Sanskrit,  Maithili,  Persian, Philosophy, Arabic, and Urdu.

Faculty of Social Sciences

This faculty consists of the departments of History, Geography, Psychology,  Ancient Indian History and Archaeology, Economics,  Personnel Management & Industrial Relations, Sociology, Political Science, and Public Administration.

Faculties of Law, Education, Commerce, Fine Arts, and Medicine

Each of these faculty comprises only one department, namely, Law, Education, Commerce, Fine Arts, and  BDS.

Affiliations
The university is an affiliating institution and has jurisdiction over the Patna city. Eleven colleges are affiliated with this university.

Academics

Traditional and distance education 
The university and its affiliated colleges and institutions offer undergraduate and postgraduate courses in different fields like law, teacher training, science, arts, commerce, medicine, and engineering. Admission in these courses is mainly based on the result of common entrance test(CET) conducted by Patna University. The aspirants for research-level programs have to sit for a qualifying test (RET) followed by an interview. Since 1974, the university also has a Directorate of Distance Education for conducting postgraduate studies in distance education.

Libraries
Central Library of the Patna University was set up in 1919. Besides the central library, there are also departmental libraries in each department of the university. The university library has a collection of more than 4,00,000 volumes which include books, journals, manuscripts, patents, and other valuable collections.

Ranking and accreditation
Patna University is recognized under Section 12B of the UGC Act. In 2019, the National Assessment and Accreditation Council (NAAC) awarded 'B+' grade to the Patna University in the first cycle of the university's accreditation.

Notable people

References

External links

 
1917 establishments in British India
Universities in Bihar
Education in Patna
Educational institutions established in 1917